The 2013–14 Hawaii Rainbow Warriors basketball team represented the University of Hawaii at Manoa during the 2013–14 NCAA Division I men's basketball season. The Rainbow Warriors, led by fourth year head coach Gib Arnold, played their home games at the Stan Sheriff Center as members of the Big West Conference. They finished the season 20–11, 9–7 in Big West play to finish in fourth place. They lost in the quarterfinals of the Big West Conference tournament to Cal State Northridge. Despite having 20 wins, they did not participate in a postseason tournament.

In October 2014, Hawaii fired head coach Gib Arnold and assistant coach Brandyn Akana, due to an NCAA investigation.

In 2015, Hawaii announced it would vacate all wins from this and the 2012–13 season due to the participation of Isaac Fotu, who was ineligible due to improper benefits.

Season

Preseason
Head coach Gib Arnold announced the team's full season schedule on August 28, 2013. The main attraction on the schedule was the announcement that Hawaiʻi would host the Outrigger Hotels Rainbow Classic, as well as the annual Diamond Head Classic. Other key non-conference games included a road game at Missouri and a home game against Montana, both participants in the 2013 NCAA Men's Division I Basketball Tournament. In the conference slate, the Rainbow Warriors were scheduled for one home game and one away game against each of the other eight members of the Big West Conference.

Roster

Schedule and results
Source: 

|-
!colspan=9 style="background:#004231; color:white;"| Exhibition

|-
!colspan=9 style="background:#004231; color:white;"| Non-conference games

|-
!colspan=9 style="background:#004231; color:white;"| Conference games

|-
!colspan=9 style="background:#004231; color:white;"| Big West tournament

References

Hawaii Rainbow Warriors basketball seasons
Hawai'i
2013 in sports in Hawaii
2014 in sports in Hawaii